Kalateh-ye Khuni (also Romanized as Kalāteh-ye Khūnī and Kalāteh Khūnī) is a village in Bakharz Rural District, in the Central District of Bakharz County, Razavi Khorasan Province, Iran. At the 2006 census, its population was 253, in 58 families.

References 

Populated places in Bakharz County